Adlerz is a surname. Notable people with the surname include:

Erik Adlerz (1892–1975), Swedish diver 
Märta Adlerz (1897–1979), Swedish diver, sister of Erik

See also
Adler (disambiguation)